All Saints’ Church, Alderwasley, is a Grade II listed parish church in the Church of England in Alderwasley, Derbyshire.

History
The church replaced the ancient chapel of St Margaret in the village. It was built by A.F. Hurt of Alderwasley Hall and placed near the hall for the convenience of the family. The church was opened on 27 September 1849.

Parish status
The church is in a joint parish with
St James the Apostle's Church, Bonsall
All Saints' Church, Bradbourne
All Saints’ Church, Ballidon
St James’ Church, Brassington
St Margaret's Church, Carsington
All Saints’ Church, Elton
St James’ Church, Idridgehay
Holy Trinity Church, Kirk Ireton
Holy Trinity Church, Middleton-by-Wirksworth
St Mary's Church, Wirksworth

Organ
The organ was installed in 1880 and was built by Brindley & Foster.  A specification of the organ can be found on the National Pipe Organ Register.

See also
Listed buildings in Alderwasley

References

Alderwasley
Alderwasley
Churches completed in 1849